Berching is a town in the district of Neumarkt in Bavaria, Germany.

Berching is a historical town with a fully preserved town wall and low streamlet. The first settlement was registered in 883, so it is more than 1100 years old. Berching is located in the district of Neumarkt in Bavaria, Germany. It is situated on the Rhine-Main-Danube Canal, 20 km south of Neumarkt in der Oberpfalz. The old town or altstadt is surrounded by a large wall interspaced with towers. One of the towers has been converted into a 6-story apartment. A small inn called the Blaue Traube is also located in the town center.

Residents

Christoph Willibald Gluck, (1714-1787), composer, was born in Weidenwang, today a district of Berching
 Claudia Brücken, (born 1963), singer, member of the bands Propaganda, Act and Onetwo

References

Neumarkt (district)